Actinolaimidae is a family of nematodes belonging to the order Dorylaimida.

Genera

Genera:
 Actinca Andrássy, 1964
 Actinolaimoides Meyl, 1957
 Actinolaimus Cobb, 1913

References

Nematodes